Paul Brown (July 8, 1969 – October 13, 2012) was an American race car driver. In 2011, he won the Pirelli World Challenge GTS Driver's Championship. In 2012, he was diagnosed with an aggressive melanoma, and died in October aged 43.

References

 https://web.archive.org/web/20130126164803/http://www.racer.com/pirelli-world-challenge-champion-paul-brown-passes-away/article/263611 archived Link of the Wayback machine (as of 2016-07-10)

Note that the article is there but for some reasons a few parts of the article are not visible. mark everything to see to see the content.

1969 births
2012 deaths
People from Covina, California
Racing drivers from California